The 1993 NCAA Division I softball season, play of college softball in the United States organized by the National Collegiate Athletic Association (NCAA) at the Division I level, began in February 1993.  The season progressed through the regular season, many conference tournaments and championship series, and concluded with the 1993 NCAA Division I softball tournament and 1993 Women's College World Series.  The Women's College World Series, consisting of the eight remaining teams in the NCAA Tournament and held in Oklahoma City at ASA Hall of Fame Stadium, ended on May 31, 1993.

Conference standings

Women's College World Series
The 1993 NCAA Women's College World Series took place from May 28 to May 31, 1993 in Oklahoma City.

Season leaders
Batting
Batting average: .521 – La'Tosha Williams, Delaware State Hornets
RBIs: 66 – Marcelina Smith, Florida A&M Lady Rattlers
Home runs: 19 – Marcelina Smith, Florida A&M Lady Rattlers

Pitching
Wins: 33-3 & 33-11 – Lisa Fernandez, UCLA Bruins & Kim Gonzalez, Texas A&M Aggies
ERA: 0.25 (9 ER/249.2 IP) – Lisa Fernandez, UCLA Bruins
Strikeouts: 484 – Michele Granger, California Golden Bears

Records
NCAA Division I season no-hitters:
9 – Michele Granger, California Golden Bears

NCAA Division I season consecutive games hit streak:
42 – Cathy Frohnheiser, Furman Paladins; March 4-April 17, 1993

Senior class single game triples:
3 – Karrie Irvin, Southern Illinois Salukis; April 24, 1993

Senior class single game strikeouts:
26 – Michele Granger, California Golden Bears; March 20, 1993

Freshman class batting average:
.521 – La'Tosha Williams, Delaware State Hornets

Freshman class perfect games:
3 – Terri Kobata, Notre Dame Fighting Irish

Sophomore class batting average:
.583 – Andrea Mollohan, Delaware State Hornets

Junior class stolen bases:
73 – Michelle Ward, East Carolina Pirates

Awards
Honda Sports Award Collegiate Woman Athlete of The Year:
Lisa Fernandez, UCLA Bruins

Honda Sports Award Softball:
Lisa Fernandez, UCLA Bruins

All America Teams
The following players were members of the All-American Teams.

First Team

Second Team

Third Team

References

External links